Nachhratpur Katabari is a census town in Raiganj CD Block in Raiganj subdivision of Uttar Dinajpur district in the Indian state of West Bengal.

Geography

Location
Nachhrtpur Katbari is located at

Demographics
As per the 2011 Census of India, Nachhratpur Katabari had a total population of 6,011, of which 3,124 (52%) were males and 2,887 (48%) were females. Population below 6 years was 673. The total number of literates in Nachhratpur Katabari was 4,129 (77.35% of the population over 6 years).

 India census, Nachhratpur Katabari had a population of 5111. Males constitute 52% of the population and females 48%. Nachhratpur Katabari has an average literacy rate of 54%, lower than the national average of 59.5%: male literacy is 60%, and female literacy is 47%. In Nachhratpur Katabari, 15% of the population is under 6 years of age.

References

Cities and towns in Uttar Dinajpur district